Norma Leticia Salazar Vázquez (born 6 August 1977) is a Mexican politician from the National Action Party. From 2009 to 2012 she served as Deputy of the LXI Legislature of the Mexican Congress representing Tamaulipas. She served as the Mayor of Matamoros, Tamaulipas from 2013 until 2016.

References

1977 births
Living people
People from Matamoros, Tamaulipas
Women members of the Chamber of Deputies (Mexico)
National Action Party (Mexico) politicians
21st-century Mexican politicians
21st-century Mexican women politicians
Deputies of the LXI Legislature of Mexico
Members of the Chamber of Deputies (Mexico) for Tamaulipas